In the 1857 Iowa State Senate elections, Iowa voters elected state senators to serve in the seventh Iowa General Assembly. Elections were held for 15 of the state senate's 36 seats. State senators serve four-year terms in the Iowa State Senate.

The general election took place in 1857.

Following the previous election in 1856, Republicans had control of the Iowa Senate with 23 seats to Democrats' 12 seats and one member from the Know Nothing Party.

To claim control of the chamber from Republicans, the Democrats needed to garner seven Senate seats.

Republicans maintained control of the Iowa State Senate following the election with the balance of power shifting to Republicans holding 22 seats and Democrats having 14 seats (a net gain of 2 seats for Democrats).

Summary of Results 
 Note: The holdover Senators not up for re-election are not listed on this table.

Source:

Detailed Results
NOTE: The Iowa General Assembly does not provide detailed vote totals for Iowa State Senate elections in 1857.

See also
 Elections in Iowa

External links
District boundaries for the Iowa Senate in 1857:
Iowa Senate Districts 1856-1859 map

References

Iowa Senate
Iowa
Iowa Senate elections